Anthony Elgindy (November 28, 1967 – July 23, 2015), was an American stock broker, and financial commentator who founded Pacific Equity Investigations.  Elgindy gained a reputation for his "investigations" of companies.  Towards the end of his life, Elgindy was convicted of insider trading and served seven years in federal prison.

Born in Egypt as Amr Ibrahim Elgindy, Elgindy was known professionally as "Anthony@Pacific", the "Internet's most theatrical short-seller".

Biography 
Elgindy originally worked as a car salesman in San Diego.  In 1988, he became a stock trader working for penny stock brokerage Blinder Robinson. He later moved to another brokerage house, Armstrong McKinley. When Armstrong McKinley came under investigation for taking bribes to recommend stock, Elgindy provided incriminating information to prosecutors. In 1995, Elgindy became a short seller.

Insider trading
After 2000, Elgindy began working with FBI agent Jeff Broyer, and gave him information on companies he believed were engaging in illegal activity. Broyer used FBI databases to search for any investigations into those companies by the FBI or the SEC. Broyer then funneled information on any pending investigations to Elgindy, who used that information to short sell the stock. An investigation uncovered his relationship with Broyer, who resigned and began working directly for Elgindy.  Broyer's girlfriend, FBI agent Lynn Wingate, continuing to funnel information to Elgindy. In  2002, Elgindy, Broyer and Wingate were indicted for their roles in the scheme.

In 2003, the National Association of Securities Dealers (NASD) ruled that Elgindy and his firm Key West Securities "engaged in a manipulative scheme in 1997 to inflate artificially the share price of Saf T Lok, Inc. through the entering of fraudulent quotations in the NASDAQ system, selling the stock short at the artificially high prices, and then taking active steps to depress the share price of Saf T Lok through the dissemination of negative research comments."

Elgindy and Key West Securities were fined $51,000 and had their NASD memberships revoked. In 2004, the SEC reversed the ban on appeal.

In a superseding indictment issued in January 2005, Elgindy was charged with racketeering, securities fraud and other crimes.  This included his scheme to steal information about FBI and separate SEC  investigations of various companies. After a four-month trial,  Elgindy was convicted of insider trading in five stocks with illegal gains totaling about $66,000.

Elgindy was sentenced to 11 years in federal prison. He was released in late 2013 after serving almost seven years. He committed suicide on July 23, 2015.

References

Further reading 
Linda Christiansen, "When Telling the Truth is a Crime, Elgindy Faces Charges that He Manipulated Stocks with Accurate Information," The Wall Street Journal, November 1, 2004
Conor Dougherty, The San Diego Union-Tribune, "SEC overturns ban on stock trader | Elgindy's firm also ordered reinstated," March 11, 2004
John R. Emshwiller, "A Felon's Wife Picks Up the Pieces Of Her Luxury Life," The Wall Street Journal, November 29, 2005
John R. Emshwiller, "Online Maverick Sells the Internet Short," The Wall Street Journal, July 22, 1999
John R. Emshwiller, Scam Dogs and Mo-Mo Mamas: Inside the Wild and Woolly World of Internet Stock Trading
Gary Wolf and Joey Anuff, "Dumb Money: Adventures of a Day Trader," Wired (Apr. 2004)
David Cohen, Chasing the Red, White, and Blue

1967 births
Living people
American people of Egyptian descent